Lifter was an American grunge band from Los Angeles, California. They are best known for their minor hit single "402", and more recently for the band's bassist Jeffrey Sebelia. Allmusic described the band as "the forgotten heroes of 90's teenage angst".

History

1992–1994: Independent releases 
Lifter was formed by Jeffrey Sebelia and Mike Coulter, who met at a rehabilitation centre. After they both left, they added John Rozas, who Coulter had worked with six years before, and the band was formed. They then began performing around the Silverlake area of Los Angeles. The band released several singles during their independent years on Fingerpaint and Triple X Records, which helped the band establish a local fanbase.

1994–1996: signing to Interscope and Melinda (Everything Was Beautiful and Nothing Hurt) 
The band signed to Interscope Records in 1994. Before the band could commence work on a full-length release, Interscope sent Mike Coulter to rehab again to recover from his heroin and cocaine addictions before they would let the band record.

The band's major label debut, Melinda (Everything Was Beautiful and Nothing Hurt) was released in April 1996, and reached number 3 on the CMJ Top 75 Alternative Airplay chart. Titled after Coulter's ex-girlfriend, the album was lyrically inspired by Coulter's breakup with the aforementioned Melinda, and was written as a way for him to cope with the separation. Upon release, Melinda received positive reviews from critics, many who complimented the album's lyrics and musicianship. Keanu Reeves of Dogstar also chose the band and the album as one of his favourites of 1996.

The album was promoted with two music videos for "Headshot" (which was also released as a single) and "The Rich, Dark, Sultry Red of Hate", which were directed by Johnathan Craven, the son of A Nightmare on Elm Street director Wes Craven. "The Rich, Dark, Sultry Red of  Hate" received some airplay on MTV's 120 Minutes, and the song "402" became a minor success after receiving airplay from Seattle radio station KNDD, though Interscope sent the station a cease-and-desist. Interscope did not release the song as a single, despite previously promising the band that it would.

Despite the positive reviews, and the minor success of "402", the album failed to bring about commercial success.

1996–1998: Breakup 
After the album's promotional cycle ended, Lifter went back to the studio with a new drummer, Angie Scarpa and producer Bob Marlette. They produced five songs together at A&M Studios in 1998, which the band submitted to their label. After the label gave no response, the band believed the forthcoming release would not be promoted by the label, and asked to be let go from their contract, to which the label obliged.

The band broke soon after, though the separation was not acrimonious. "We played for a while, and then it just stopped", said Mike Coulter. In a 2006 interview, Coulter blamed the band's breakup on his disappointment with the album's failure, and him denying his interest in music as a result; "For a long time I wasn’t even able to listen to music. I hated it because it had broken my heart.”

2004–2012: Brief reunions 
In 2004, the band set up a website on the URL facecrime.com, which caused some confusion as the link was previously used by an At the Drive-In fan message board of the same name. The band released some mp3s of the band's 1998 demos, as well as some other demos from that period .

In 2006, Jeffrey Sebelia and Mike Coulter collaborated once again to record a song for Olympus Fashion Week, "Swing". Following this, Sebelia announced Lifter would record a new album, however, nothing ever materialised of this. There have been no updates to the band's website since 2006, and the band is considered defunct.

Post-breakup activities 
Since the band's breakup, the band's various members have done various activities.

Mike Coulter went on a long hiatus from the music industry. He released his first studio album in nearly 20 years, Saviors, on September 15, 2015, through Cautionary Tail Records. The album contains a re-recording one of Lifter's 1998 demos, "Calm Me Down".

Jeffrey Sebelia became a fashion designer, and went on to win the third season of Bravo series Project Runaway in 2006, despite his unpopularity with audiences for being hostile and allegations of cheating by one of the contestants, Laura Bennett.

Appearances in other media 

 The band and Mike Coulter were featured as part of ex-Bad Religion drummer John Albert's 2005 book "Wrecking Crew: The Really Bad News Griffith Park Pirates".
 "Swing" was featured as part of Jeffery Sebellia's runway show at the last show of Olympus Fashion Week in 2006.

Band members 
Final line-up
 Mike Coulter - vocals, guitar (1992-1998, 2006)
 Jeffrey Sebelia - bass (1992-1998, 2006)
 Angie Scarpa - drums (1996-1998)
Past members
 John Rozas - drums (1992-1996)

Discography

Studio albums

Singles

Split releases

Music videos

External links 

 https://www.biggerthanchristmas.com/the-story, by Mike Coulter; further insight into the band

References 

American grunge groups
Interscope Records artists
American musical trios
Musical groups from Los Angeles
Musical groups established in 1992
Musical groups disestablished in 1998